Sky Mirror is a public sculpture by artist Anish Kapoor. Commissioned by the Nottingham Playhouse, it is installed outside the theatre in Wellington Circus, Nottingham, England. Sky Mirror is a -wide concave dish of polished stainless steel weighing  and angled up towards the sky. Its surface reflects the ever-changing environment.

It took six years from the initial idea for a major new piece of public art to the unveiling of Sky Mirror on 27 April 2001, and cost £900,000. At the time, it was the most expensive piece of civic art funded by the National Lottery. It was manufactured in Finland.

In autumn 2007 the Nottingham Playhouse Sky Mirror was voted Pride of Place in a poll to find Nottingham's favourite landmark. More recently, Sky Mirror has been installed in Brighton's Pavilion Gardens for the Brighton Festival.

From 19 September to 27 October 2006, a larger version of Sky Mirror was installed at Rockefeller Center in New York City. The convex side faced Fifth Avenue, the concave side the Rockefeller Center courtyard.

Versions of Sky Mirror also exist in the Hermitage Museum in Saint Petersburg, Russia, in front of the Casino de Monte-Carlo in Monaco, in the Serralves Museum in Porto, Portugal and in the De Pont Museum of Contemporary Art in Tilburg, the Netherlands.

From 28 September 2010, Sky Mirror and three other Kapoor sculptures were exhibited in Kensington Gardens, London. The open-air exhibition was titled Turning the World Upside Down and it ran until 13 March 2011. It was accessible from 6 a.m. until dusk. Kapoor said that Kensington Gardens was "the best site in London for a piece of art, probably in the world". The location of Sky Mirror was previously occupied by a sculpture by Henry Moore – a work that was donated by the artist, but had been removed for conservation in 1996. Kapoor's sculptures are guarded round-the-clock at a cost estimated to be £120,000 paid for by the Royal Parks Agency.

Sky Mirrors permanent installation is at Dallas Cowboys Art Collection at AT&T Stadium.

Gallery

References

External links

Anish Kapoor official website
Sky Mirror website
Images of the Sky Mirror and Wellington Circus from BBC Nottingham
Sky Mirror, New York
The State Heritage Museum, St. Petersburg

Tourist attractions in Nottingham
Sculptures by Anish Kapoor
2001 sculptures
Parabolas
Mirrors in art